Sonja Lund (born March 29, 1942) is a Swedish actress and dancer. She is the mother of actress Regina Lund.

References

1942 births
Living people
Swedish actresses
Swedish female dancers